Porcelain manufacturing companies are firms which manufacture porcelain.

European porcelain manufacturers before the 18th century
The table below lists European manufacturers of porcelain established before the 18th century. This table may be sorted according to the year of foundation, description and country.

18th-century European porcelain manufacturing companies
The table below lists European manufacturers of porcelain established in the 18th century. This table may be sorted according to the year of foundation, description and country.

19th-century European porcelain manufacturing companies
The table below lists European manufacturers of porcelain established in the 19th century. This table may be sorted according to the year of foundation, description and country.

Current porcelain manufacturers in Germany

Current porcelain manufacturers in other European countries

References

Ceramics manufacturers of Germany
Porcelain
Ceramics manufacturers
German porcelain
Porcelain of France
British porcelain